The HD Pentax-D FA 645 Macro 90mm F2.8 ED AW SR is an interchangeable macro lens for the Pentax 645 system, announced by Pentax on September 10, 2012.

References
HD Pentax D FA 645 Macro 90mm F2.8 ED AW SR: Digital Photography Review

Camera lenses introduced in 2012
090
Pentax 090mm f/2.8